Operation Spy could refer to:
Operation Spy, an interactive exhibition at the International Spy Museum
EyeToy: Operation Spy, a video game for PlayStation 2